Adriana Rodríguez Fuentes (born 12 July 1999) is a Cuban athlete competing in the heptathlon and long jump. She represented her country in the latter at the 2019 World Championships in Doha without reaching the final. Earlier that year she won a heptathlon gold at the 2019 Pan American Games.

International competitions

Personal bests
Outdoors
100 metres – 11.39 (+0.4 m/s, Camagüey 2018)
200 metres – 23.63 (+0.6 m/s, Barranquilla 2018)
400 metres – 54.14 (Havana 2019)
800 metres – 2:18.49 (Lima 2019)
100 metres hurdles – 13.32 (+0.1 m/s, Havana 2019)
High jump – 1.80 (Bydgoszcz 2016)
Long jump – 6.70 (-0.8 m/s, Cáceres 2019)
Shot put – 13.29 (Götzis 2018)
Javelin throw – 37.36 (Bydgoszcz 2016)
Heptathlon – 6113 (Lima 2019)

Notes

References

External links 
 Adriana Rodríguez Fuentes at the 2019 Pan American Games

1999 births
Living people
Cuban female long jumpers
Cuban heptathletes
World Athletics Championships athletes for Cuba
Athletes (track and field) at the 2019 Pan American Games
Pan American Games gold medalists in athletics (track and field)
Pan American Games gold medalists for Cuba
Medalists at the 2019 Pan American Games
Competitors at the 2018 Central American and Caribbean Games
21st-century Cuban women